Richard Locke may refer to:
 Richard Locke (critic), American critic and essayist
 Richard M. Locke, American political scientist
 Richard Holt Locke, American actor, AIDS educator and activist

See also
 Dick Locke, member of the Florida House of Representatives